The men's shot put event  at the 2002 European Athletics Indoor Championships was held on March 1–2.

Medalists

Note: Mikuláš Konopka of Slovakia had originally won the bronze but was later disqualified for doping.

Results

Qualification
Qualifying perf. 20.20 (Q) or 8 best performers (q) advanced to the Final.

Final

References
Results

Shot put at the European Athletics Indoor Championships
Shot